Greya marginimaculata is a moth of the family Prodoxidae. It is found in Japan on the main island of Honshu and possibly the Russian Far East.

The wingspan is 14–16 mm. The forewings are brownish fuscous with a slight bronzy shine and six to nine near-white costal, dorsal and apical spots.

References

Moths described in 1957
Prodoxidae
Moths of Japan